Tennille is a city in Washington County, Georgia, United States. The population was 1,539 at the 2010 census.

History
The Georgia General Assembly incorporated Tennille in 1875. The community was named after Francis Tennille, an early settler.

Geography

Tennille is located at  (32.938174, -82.810582).

Demographics

At the 2000 census, there were 1,505 people, 599 households and 382 families living in the city. The racial makeup of the city was 41.99% White, 56.88% African American, 0.20% Native American, 0.40% from other races, and 0.53% from two or more races. Hispanic or Latino of any race were 1.53% of the population.

There were 599 households, of which 32.2% had children under the age of 18 living with them, 31.6% were married couples living together, 28.2% had a female householder with no husband present, and 36.1% were non-families. 32.9% of all households were made up of individuals, and 18.0% had someone living alone who was 65 years of age or older.  The average household size was 2.49 and the average family size was 3.22.

30.2% of the population were under the age of 18, 10.0% from 18 to 24, 23.5% from 25 to 44, 18.0% from 45 to 64, and 18.2% who were 65 years of age or older. The median age was 35 years. For every 100 females, there were 72.2 males. For every 100 females age 18 and over, there were 66.1 males.

The median household income was $22,065, and the median family income was $30,000. Males had a median income of $30,625 versus $19,948 for females. The per capita income for the city was $12,987. About 27.5% of families and 29.3% of the population were below the poverty line, including 40.1% of those under age 18 and 24.4% of those age 65 or over.

Notable people
Charles E. Choate, an architect whose works are listed on the National Register of Historic Places, resided at Tennille.

See also

 Central Savannah River Area

References

Cities in Georgia (U.S. state)
Cities in Washington County, Georgia